Stojkovići is a village in the municipality of Novi Travnik, Bosnia and Herzegovina.

Demographics 
According to the 2013 census, its population was 445.

References

Populated places in Novi Travnik